XHPJ-FM (106.9 FM, "Classic 106.9") is a Classic rock radio station in Monterrey, Nuevo León, Mexico. The station broadcasts announcements and commercials in Spanish, though the music played is in English.

History
XHPJ received its concession on November 24, 1976. It was owned by Juan B. Peimbert Jiménez Castro and sold almost immediately to Multimedios.

References

External links
Station Website

Radio stations in Monterrey
Multimedios Radio